

U
 UBTX - Union Camp Corporation
 UCCX - Union Carbide Canada, Ltd.
 UCEX - Union Electric Company
 UCFX - Union Carbide Corporation
 UCLX - Vulcan Minerals Company
 UCOX - Union Carbide Corporation
 UCPX - Essem Corporation
 UCR  - Utah Coal Route
 UELX - United Equipment Leasing Associates; Archer Daniels Midland
 UECZ - Union Elevator Co.
 UEEZ - Union Equity Elevator Co.
 UEFZ - Union Equity
 UFIX - Utility Fuels, Inc.
 UIWX - Riley Stoker Corporation
 UMP  - Upper Merion and Plymouth Railroad
 UMPX - Upper Merion and Plymouth Leasing Company
 UNI  - Unity Railways
 UNCX - Union Carbide Canada, Ltd.
 UNPX - Procor
 UNSX - Unitrain Services
 UO   - Union Railroad (Oregon)
 UOCX - General American Transportation Corporation
 UP   - Union Pacific Railroad
 UPAX - United Power Association
 UPB  - Union Pacific Railroad
 UPFE - Pacific Fruit Express; Union Pacific Railroad
 UPM  - Union Pacific Railroad (Milwaukee Road directed operations)
 UPOZ - United Parcel Service
 UPP  - Union Pacific Railroad (passenger cars)
 UPRQ - Union Pacific Railroad End Of Train Devices
 UPRX - Union Pacific Fruit Express Company
 UPS  - Union Pacific Railroad (slugs)
 UPSZ - United Parcel Service
 UPT  - Union Pacific Railroad (fuel tenders)
 UPWZ - United Parcel Service
 UPX  - Union Pearson Express
 UPY  - Union Pacific Railroad (yard switchers)
 URDX - United States Steel
 URR  - Union Railroad (Pittsburgh, Pennsylvania)
 URTX - Union Refrigerator Transit Line; General American Transportation Corporation
 URY  - Union Railway of Memphis
 USAX - United States Army
 USBX - GE Rail Services
 USCX - William G. Simon
 USEX - Evans Railcar Leasing Company
 USFU - United States Air Force
 USGX - Union Sugar Company
 USIX - US Industrial Chemicals Company
 USLF - Burlington Northern Railroad
 USLX - Evans Railcar Leasing Company; GE Capital Railcar Services
 USNX - United States Navy
 USPX - US Plastics Corporation
 USRX - U.S. Railways, Inc.
 USSX - United States Steel
 USWX - USA Waste Services
 UTAH - Utah Railway
 UTAX - Utah Transit Authority (formerly assigned to United Transportation, Inc.)
 UTBX - Union Tank Car Company
 UTCX - Union Tank Car Company
 UTLX - Union Tank Car Company
 UTPX - Union Texas Petroleum Corporation
 UTR  - Union Transportation
 UTTX - Trailer Train Company

References 

U